William Osgood Aydelotte (September 1, 1910 – January 17, 1996) was an American historian focused on the British Parliament, a pioneer in applying the statistics to historical research.

Aydelotte was one of the first historians elected to the National Academy of Sciences. The New York Times called him "an authority on British history". 
The National Academies Press called him "A leading figure in the development of social science history in the United States". Aydelotte served as the chairman of the University of Iowa history department.

Early life and education 
Aydelotte was born in Bloomington, Indiana, the only child of Marie Jeanette Osgood and Franklin Ridgeway Aydelotte. He graduated from Harvard College in 1931, and a received doctoral degree from Cambridge University in 1934.

Career 
Aydelotte was the chairman of the University of Iowa history department from 1947 to 1959 and from 1965 to 1968. He retired in 1978. He was married to Myrtle Aydelotte, former nursing school dean at Iowa, from 1956 until his death.

Notable works 
 Bismarck and British Colonial Policy: The Problem of South West Africa, 1883-1885 (University of Pennsylvania Press, 1937; 2d edition, Russell & Russell, 1970)
 The History of Parliamentary Behavior (Princeton University Press, 1977.)
 Quantification in History (Addison-Wesley, 1971)

References

External links
Allan G. Bogue and Gilbert White, "William Osgood Aydelotte", Biographical Memoirs of the National Academy of Sciences (1998)
 The William O. Aydelotte Papers are housed at the University of Iowa Special Collections & University Archives.

1910 births
1996 deaths
Harvard College alumni
Honorary Members of the Order of the British Empire
Members of the United States National Academy of Sciences
Writers from Bloomington, Indiana
Writers from Iowa City, Iowa
Princeton University faculty
Smith College faculty
Trinity College (Connecticut) faculty
University of Iowa faculty
20th-century American historians
American male non-fiction writers
American expatriates in the United Kingdom
20th-century American male writers
Historians from Iowa